Talwandi Bhindran (Urdu:تلونڈی بھنڈراں) is a city and Union Council in the northeast of the Narowal District, And Talwandi Bhindran is the largest town of the Narowal District  Punjab, Pakistan.

It is situated on the banks of Ravi River, 10 to12 km from the Indian border.

History 
It is believed that Talwandi Bhindran was founded by a person named Talwandi Singh (تلونڈی سنگھ) in 18th century. He belonged to the Jutt tribe and so his clan was '''Bhinder (بھنڈر). Later on this place was called Talwandi Bhindran (تلونڈی بھنڈراں).
From the British Raj to 1991 until the Narowal was recognized as district it had been the part of Sialkot.
Talwandi Bhindran has the central status among the relative villages nearby.

List of educational institutions 

Govt CD Islamia Higher Secondary School Talwandi Bhindran
Govt Girls High School Talwandi Bhindran
Govt Girls Elementary School Talwandi Bhindran
Govt Zainab Bibi Hameeda Girls Degree College Talwandi Bhindran

List of villages 
 Gullah Moharan
 Charkey
 Mohanwali
 Datewal
 Muzafar
 Dhili
 Chamba Baath
 Adokey Klan
 Balakey Klan
 Buda Dhola
 Nidokey
 Harolay
 Halowal
 Lala Syeda
 Khara Mega
 Mlokpur
 Dhodha
 Loban Puli
 Thetherwali
 Tatlay
 Ali Akbar bagh

List of hospitals 
 Rural Health Care centre Talwandi Bhindran
 Civil Veterinary Dispensary Vallekey
 Tatla Hospital

Stores and banks 
 HBL Talwandi Bhindran branch
 BOP Talwandi Bhindran Branch

Mosques 
 Jamea Masjid Gulzaray Madina Talwandi Bhindran
 Jamea Masjid Faizane Madina Talwandi Bhindran
 Jamea Masjid Anware Madina Talwandi Bhindran
 Bilal Masjid Talwandi Bhindran
 Jamea Masjid Panjtanpak Madina Talwandi Bhindran
 Maki Masjid Talwandi Bhindran
 Jamia Masjid Usmania, Talwandi Bhindran
 Jamia Masjid Farooq e Azam, Talwandi Bhindran

Church 

 United Presbyterian Church Talwandi Bhindran

References 

Populated places in Narowal District
City-states